"Basketball" is a rap song written by William Waring, Robert Ford, Kurtis Blow, J. B. Moore, Jimmy Bralower, and Full Force and recorded by Kurtis Blow, released in 1984 from his album Ego Trip.

Song history

According to Blow, the idea for the song came from his then-girlfriend (whom he later married), who told him, "You need to make a song about basketball, it's the No. 1 sport for African-Americans and nobody has done it yet." Twenty-five famous basketball players are mentioned during the recording. Waring was primarily responsible for choosing which players would be mentioned in the song, but Blow specified that his favorite player, Julius "Dr. J" Erving, would be mentioned first. Blow said in 2013, "We wanted the guys we grew up watching who were all out of the league by the time the song came out, and the best of that time." The lyrics consist of rhymed couplets, a structure which has been described as "typical of early-1980s rap". The song's hook was sung by Alyson Williams, who later had hit songs of her own on the R&B chart.

The music video for the song was directed by Michael Oblowitz, who had a $25,000 budget. The video included cameos by rappers The Fat Boys and Whodini. Although Blow had wanted the video to include footage of the players mentioned in the song, the National Basketball Association would only provide clearance for use of still photos of Micheal Ray Richardson (who is not mentioned in the lyrics).  

Nevertheless, the NBA later took an interest in Blow's song and played it at games, as well as creating its own video that featured clips of every player mentioned in the song. Blow said, "When the song was peaking, the NBA started flying me around to do shows. ... I would do a live performance right after the game to fill the arena."

The video game NBA 2K12 used the song during the introduction.

Charts

Lil’ Bow Wow version 

Lil' Bow Wow covered the song in 2002, featuring Jermaine Dupri, Fabolous and Fundisha for the Like Mike soundtrack. Music video for the original Kurtis Blow version was directed by Michael Oblowitz and co-produced by Michael Oblowitz and David Theo Goldberg for Metafilms in New York City in 1984. The song was used in the opening video, and as part of the soundtrack, in the video game NBA 2K12.

Charts

In popular culture 
 In 2016, the song was played during an episode of The Goldbergs entitled "Dungeons and Dragons, Anyone?". Kurtis Blow also recorded a new version of the song with lyrics about the game Dungeons & Dragons for the episode.
 In American Dad!, season 11, episode 18, the song plays during a segment where Stan and Roger play one-on-one basketball.

 In The Simpsons , season 28, episode 17, the song plays during the aftermath of the documentary.

References

External links

1984 songs
1984 singles
2002 singles
Kurtis Blow songs
Bow Wow (rapper) songs
Jermaine Dupri songs
Fabolous songs
Song recordings produced by Jermaine Dupri
Songs written by Jermaine Dupri